Asuka Nomura (野村明日香 Nomura Asuka, born July 23, 1994) is a Japanese volleyball player who plays for Toray Arrows.

Clubs
  Kyushubunka high school
  Toray Arrows (2013-)

External links
 Toray Arrows Women's Volleyball Team

1994 births
Living people
Japanese women's volleyball players
People from Gifu